The Archdeacon of Canterbury is a senior office-holder in the Diocese of Canterbury (a division of the Church of England Province of Canterbury). Like other archdeacons, he or she is an administrator in the diocese at large (having oversight of parishes in roughly one-third of the diocese) and is a Canon Residentiary of the cathedral.

History
The Archdeacon of Canterbury has an additional role, traditionally serving as the Archbishop of Canterbury's representative at enthronement ceremonies for new diocesan bishops in his province. At these services, the Archdeacon reads the Archbishop's mandate and, taking the new bishop by the hand, conducts him to his episcopal throne.

The archdeaconry and archdeacon of Canterbury have been in constant existence since the 11th century. There was one short-lived attempt to split the role in the 12th century. In modern times, the archdeaconry has been split twice: creating Maidstone archdeaconry in 1841 and Ashford archdeaconry in 2011.

Composition
The archdeaconry covers approximately the north-east corner of the diocese. , the archdeaconry of Canterbury consists the following deaneries in the Diocese of Canterbury:
Deanery of Canterbury
Deanery of East Bridge
Deanery of Reculver
Deanery of Thanet
Deanery of West Bridge

List of archdeacons

Pre-Norman Conquest
798: Wulfred
844:Beornoth
853: Athelweald
864: Ealstan
866: Sigifrith
866: Liaving
890: Werbeald
bef. 1054: Brinstan
1054 Haimo

High Medieval
bef. –aft. : Valerius
bef. 1075–aft. 1086: Ansketil
bef. 1099–aft. 1108: William
1115–May 1125 (res.): John
bef. 1126–1138: Helewise
bef. –March 1148 (res.): Walter
aft. 1148–October 1154 (res.): Roger de Pont L'Évêque
aft. 1154–1163 (res.): Thomas Becket (also Archbishop of Canterbury from 1162)
bef. 1163–October 1174 (res.): Geoffrey Ridel
1175–June 1194 (res.): Herbert Poore
bef. 1194–aft. 1195 (res.): Philip of Poitou
bef. 1196–aft. 1206: Henry de Castilion
bef. 1213–May 1227 (res.): Henry Sandford
14 May 1227 – 1248 (d.): Simon Langton
28 January 1232–?: Richard de Sancto Johanne (ineffective royal appointment)
bef. 1248–July 1269 (d.): Stephen de Monte Luelli (aka of Vienne)
aft. July 1269–9 October 1275 (d.): Hugh de Mortuo Mari
October 1275–May 1278 (res.): William Middleton
1278–bef. 1280 (d.): Robert of Gernemue
aft. 1280–1299 (res.): Richard de Ferings
29 June 1299–September 1305 (res.): John de Langeton

Late Medieval
22 September 1305–bef. 1306 (res.): Simon de Faversham
13 February 1306 – 22 November 1310 (res.): Bernard Ezius de le Breto
3 December 1310–bef. 1319 (res.): Guichard de le Breto
1 May 1319–bef. 1323 (d.): Simon of Comminges (Simon Convenis), son of Bernard VII, Count of Comminges and brother of Bernard VIII, Count of Comminges
18 April 1323 – 1323 (dep.): John Bruton
23 April 1323–November 1325 (d.): Raymond de Roux
13 March 1326 – 1332 (res.): Hugh de Angoulême
15 July 1332 – 1333 (res.): Simon de Montacute
1334–1337 (res.): Robert de Stratford
bef. 1338–bef. 1343 (d.): Bernard Sistre
25 June 1343–bef. 1370 (res.): Pierre Roger (became Pope Gregory XI)
28 June 1343–bef. 1348 (res.): Simon Islip (royal grant; set aside)
bef. 1372–28 April 1374 (d.): William Cardinal de la Jugee(cardinal-priest of St Clement)
6 June 1374 – 12 September 1375 (res.): Henry de Wakefield
aft. 1375–3 June 1379 (deprived): Aymar Roche
adt. 1379–9 September 1381 (res.): John de Fordham
20 September 1381–bef. 1390 (d.): William Pakington
28 July 1390 – 23 February 1397 (exch.): Adam Mottrum
26 August 1390 – 1390: Thomas Butiller (ineffective royal grant)
23 February 1397 – 1400 (res.): Richard Clifford
7 April 1400 – 12 May 1406 (res.): Robert Hallam
28 October 1406 – 31 May 1408 (d.): Angelo Cardinal Acciaioli, Dean of theCollege of Cardinals & cardinal-bishop of Ostia and Velletri (obedience of Rome)
13 July 1408 – 1415 (res.): John Wakering

5 June 1416–bef. 1420 (d.): Henry Rumworth (or Circeter)
3 October 1420–bef. 1424 (d.): William Chichele
10 June 1424–bef. 1434 (res.): Prospero Cardinal Colonna(cardinal-deacon of St George in Velabro)
14 December 1434 – 26 January 1467 (d.): Thomas Chichele
bef. 1467–bef. 1479 (d.): Thomas Winterbourne
February 1479–bef. 1495 (d.): John Bourgchier
26 November 1495 – 25 July 1504 (d.): Hugh Peynthwyn
aft. 1505–bef. 1534 (res.): William Warham
9 March 1534 – 15 March 1554 (deprived): Edmund Cranmer

Early modern
March 1554–bef. 1559 (deprived): Nicholas Harpsfield
November 1559–bef. 1571 (res.): Edmund Gheast, Bishop of Rochester
aft. 1572–aft. 1575 (res.): Edmund Freke, Bishop of Rochester
17 May 1576 – 1595 (res.): William Redman
January 1595–29 March 1619 (d.): Charles Fotherby (also Dean of Canterbury from 1615)
10 April 1619 – 29 January 1648 (d.): William Kingsley
1648–1660: See suspended during the Commonwealth of England
August 1660–23 August 1668 (d.): George Hall (also Bishop of Chester from 1662)
7 October 1668 – 1670 (res.): William Sancroft
18 November 1672 – 20 March 1688 (d.): Samuel Parker (also Bishop of Oxford from 1686)
22 March 1688 – 10 October 1708 (d.): John Battely
28 October 1708 – 1721 (res.): Thomas Green
7 November 1721 – 23 August 1724 (d.): Thomas Bowers (also Bishop of Chichester from 1722)
1 September 1724 – 1748 (res.): Samuel Lisle (also Bishop of St Asaph from 1744)
April 1748–4 December 1769 (d.): John Head (Sir John Head, 5th Baronet from 1768)
13 December 1769 – 29 September 1788 (d.): William Backhouse
7 November 1788 – 1 May 1803 (d.): John Lynch
19 May 1803 – 8 April 1822 (d.): Houstonne Radcliffe
26 April 1822–bef. 1825 (res.): Hugh Percy
18 June 1825 – 9 May 1869 (d.): James Croft

Late modern
1869–November 1890 (ret.): Edward Parry (also Bishop suffragan of Dover from 1870)
1890–1897 (res.): Rodney Eden (also Bishop suffragan of Dover from 1890)
bef. 1898–17 October 1918 (d.): William Walsh (also Bishop suffragan of Dover from 1898)
1918–1924 (res.): Leonard White-Thomson
1924–1939 (ret.): Edward Hardcastle (afterwards archdeacon emeritus)
1939–1942 (ret.): Karl Sopwith (afterwards archdeacon emeritus)
1942–1968 (ret.): Alexander Sargent
1967–1972 (res.): Michael Nott
1972–1981 (ret.): Bernard Pawley (afterwards archdeacon emeritus)
1981–1986 (res.): John Simpson
1986–1996 (res.): Michael Till
1996–2001 (res.): John Pritchard
2002–2007 (ret.): Patrick Evans (afterwards archdeacon emeritus)
April 20076 January 2016 (res.): Sheila Watson
6 December 201522 January 2017: Philip Down & Stephen Taylor, Joint Acting Archdeacons of Canterbury.
22 January 20174 December 2021 (res.): Jo Kelly-Moore
18 July 2022present: Will Adam

References

Sources

Anglican ecclesiastical offices
 
Church of England
Diocese of Canterbury
Lists of Anglicans
Lists of English people